Justin Azevedo (born April 1, 1988) is a Canadian ice hockey forward currently playing for the ZSC Lions of the National League (NL).

Playing career

Junior
Azevedo played his first OHL game on September 24, 2004 as a member of the Kitchener Rangers. During the 2007–08 OHL season, Azevedo won the Red Tilson Trophy for the most outstanding player in the OHL, Eddie Powers Memorial Trophy for being the top scorer in the OHL, Ed Chynoweth Trophy for being the top scorer of the Memorial Cup, CHL Player of the Year, CHL Top Scorer Award, and Wayne Gretzky 99 Award for being the most outstanding player in the OHL playoffs.

Professional
Azevedo was drafted 153rd overall, in the 6th round of the 2008 NHL Entry Draft by the Los Angeles Kings. As an older draft pick, Azevedo immediately turned professional and was signed by the Kings AHL affiliate, the Manchester Monarchs on August 10, 2008. After attending the Kings training camp on September 29, 2008, he was assigned to the Monarchs for the 2008–09 season.

Despite missing significant parts of the season with the Monarchs suffering two injuries, Azevedo scored 36 points in 49 games to earn a two-year entry level contract with the Kings on July 20, 2009.

Azevedo was one of two players, alongside left wing Brandon Kozun, to be allowed a penalty shot in the same game during Manchester's 5-2 victory over the Providence Bruins, a franchise record for the Manchester Monarchs.

On June 7, 2012, he signed with Lukko Rauma, in the Finnish SM-liiga. In his first European season in 2012–13, Azevedo made a comfortable transition with Lukko, leading the SM-Liiga amongst rookies with 38 assists and 58 points. Azevedo lead the entire league in playoffs scoring with 10 goals and 18 points in only 14 games to also earn a selection in the SM-liiga All-Star Team.

On April 15, 2013, Azevedo opted to play in the Kontinental Hockey League, signing a multi-year contract with Czech based club, HC Lev Praha for the 2013–14 season. Azevedo contributed with 9 goals and 27 assists in 48 games for Lev before stepping up in the playoffs for a second consecutive season, to post 13 goals and 20 points in 22 games.

Despite reaching the Gagarin Cup finals, Lev announced they would not continue participation due to bankruptcy. On July 1, 2014, Azevedo was transferred to fellow KHL club, Ak Bars Kazan, in exchange for financial compensation.

Career statistics

Regular season and playoffs

International

Awards and honours

References

External links

1988 births
Living people
Ak Bars Kazan players
Canadian expatriate ice hockey players in the Czech Republic
Canadian expatriate ice hockey players in Finland
Canadian expatriate ice hockey players in Russia
Canadian ice hockey centres
Canadian people of Portuguese descent
Kitchener Rangers players
HC Lev Praha players
Los Angeles Kings draft picks
Lukko players
Manchester Monarchs (AHL) players
People from Elgin County
ZSC Lions players
Canadian expatriate ice hockey players in the United States
Canadian expatriate ice hockey players in Switzerland